Vrh pri Sobračah (in older sources also Vrh pri Subračah) is a small settlement in the Municipality of Ivančna Gorica in central Slovenia. It lies just off the regional road leading through the Sava Hills from Ivančna Gorica towards Šmartno pri Litiji in the historical region of Lower Carniola. The municipality is now included in the Central Slovenia Statistical Region.

References

External links
Vrh pri Sobračah on Geopedia

Populated places in the Municipality of Ivančna Gorica